Won-chul, also spelled Won-chol, is a Korean masculine given name. Its meaning differs based on the hanja used to write each syllable of the name. There are 35 hanja with the reading "won" and 11 hanja with the reading "chul" on the South Korean government's official list of hanja which may be registered for use in given names.

People with this name include:
Paek Won-chul (born 1977), South Korean handball player
Yoo Won-chul (born 1984), South Korean gymnast
Yun Won-chol (born 1989), North Korean Greco-Roman wrestler

See also
List of Korean given names

References

Korean masculine given names